This is a list of defunct airlines of Togo.

See also
 List of airlines of Togo
 List of airports in Togo

References

Togo
Airlines
Airlines, defunct